Burdette C. Solum (August 16, 1927 – December 28, 2012) was an American politician from Watertown, South Dakota and served in the South Dakota House of Representatives from 1991 to 1992 and again as a vacancy from 1998 until 2004.

Solum was a 21-year veteran of the South Dakota National Guard including the Korean War and also served in the Army during World War II.

References

1927 births
2012 deaths
Members of the South Dakota House of Representatives